"" ("God is Truth") is the national anthem of the Cook Islands. It was adopted in 1982, replacing the previous New Zealand anthem "God Defend New Zealand".

History 
The music is by Sir Tom Davis, then Prime Minister of the Cook Islands. The lyrics are by his wife, Pa Tepaeru Terito Ariki, Lady Davis. In 1982, article 76(D) of the constitution of the Cook Islands declared the song the official anthem of the Cook Islands. Before, the country used the New Zealand National Anthem.

The change was heavily disliked by residents of the islands. They pointed out the new words were not part of their language, te reo Māori, and claimed the change was offensive towards Sir Tom Davis and Pa Tepaeru Ariki Lady Davis.

Lyrics

Notes

References

External links
 (female voice and guitar)
 (3-part a cappella, first 2½ lines missing)

National anthems
National symbols of the Cook Islands
Cook Islands music
Oceanian anthems
New Zealand songs